There are several Gibraltar Barracks in the world.

Gibraltar Barracks, Bury St Edmunds
Gibraltar Barracks, Northampton
Gibraltar Barracks, Minley

See also
 Gibraltar Camp, a refugee camp in Jamaica during World War II